Greens and Eco-pacifists (VyE) was a Spanish party alliance in the 2011 Valencian regional election formed by The Greens of the Valencian Country (EVPV), The Eco-pacifist Greens (LVE) and The Greens–Green Group (LV–GV).

Composition

References

Defunct political party alliances in Spain
Green political parties